Pittwater Council was a local government area on the Northern Beaches of Sydney, in the state of New South Wales, Australia. The area is named after Pittwater, the body of water adjacent to much of the area governed. First proclaimed in 1906 as the A Riding of Warringah Shire, the area was proclaimed as the Municipality of Pittwater on 1 May 1992. On 12 May 2016, the Minister for Local Government announced that Pittwater Council would be subsumed into the newly formed Northern Beaches Council. The last Mayor of Pittwater Council was Councillor Jacqui Townsend, an independent politician.

Suburbs and localities
Suburbs and localities serviced by Pittwater Council were:

History
The Pittwater Shire was named after an estuary of Broken Bay which the shire surrounds. Broken Bay forms the mouth of the Hawkesbury River, the main river which formed the Cumberland Plain and Sydney basin. Pittwater was discovered in 1788, the year the first British colony was established in Australia. However, Pittwater and the surrounding region was inhabited for many millennia by local Aboriginal tribes and much evidence of their habitation remains especially their rock etchings in Ku-ring-gai Chase National Park which borders Pittwater's western side.  Pittwater was named in about 1800 by the colony's first Governor, Arthur Phillip, honouring the then British Prime Minister, William Pitt the Younger.

Pittwater in the early 19th century was developed as a new port with loading and unloading facilities erected at what is now the current Newport public wharf. As the port developed so did local industry such as sheep at Mona Vale, orchards at southern Newport and Church Point, salt from Saltpan cove and Scotland Island. During the period from the 1950s to the early 1970s, sand mining operations were undertaken in the upper reaches of McCarr's Creek. After sand mining operations ceased, the tailings ponds were all that remained of the mining operation. Around the 1850s a school was established on the site of what is now Newport Public school. Over later periods, public (primary) schools were established at Mona Vale, Avalon and Bilgola Plateau. In 1963, Pittwater High School was opened at Mona Vale (located on Pittwater Road), Barrenjoey High School (located at the northern end of Avalon beach) was opened in 1968. During the Second World War, unlike Sydney Harbour (Port Jackson), Pittwater was not protected by a boom net. As a consequence local militia and later Australian Army were stationed at the western side of the entrance to Pittwater and were dispersed along the western shore in a network of trenches, pillboxes and gun emplacements.

Pittwater was first incorporated in 1906 when it was included as the "A Riding" of Warringah Shire Council. However for many years there existed a sentiment held by some in A Riding, the northern Riding and the largest in Warringah, taking up more than 40% of Warringah's land area, that they were being increasingly ignored and subject to what they considered inappropriate development and policies for their area. This culminated in 1991 when a non-compulsory postal poll of the residents of A Riding was taken over the question of a possible secession. This resulted in a 73.5% vote in favour of secession, however only 48.18% of residents took part in this vote. This vote was, however, 600 short of the total majority required.

The Minister for Local Government at the time, Gerry Peacocke, nevertheless announced the secession of A Riding from Warringah Council, considering that those who did not vote did not have any particular inclination to how they were governed, and thus Pittwater Council was created. On 1 May 1992, The Governor of New South Wales, Rear Admiral Peter Sinclair, proclaimed the establishment of the Municipality of Pittwater, the area of which roughly followed the area formerly known as 'A' Riding of the Warringah Shire. Also on that day, the offices of Robert Dunn, Eric Green and Ronald Starr, former Warringah 'A' Riding Councillors, were terminated with those persons forming, with others, a nine-member Provisional Council of the Municipality of Pittwater. Despite the Municipality status requiring the new council members to be titled "Alderman", Pittwater obtain the permission of Minister Peacocke to continue the use of "Councillor" to refer to the members.

When the Local Government Act 1993 came into effect from 1 July 1993, the title of the council changed from the Municipality of Pittwater to simply Pittwater Council.

Amalgamation
A 2015 review of local government boundaries by the NSW Government Independent Pricing and Regulatory Tribunal recommended that the Pittwater Council merge with adjoining councils. The government considered two proposals. The alternative, proposed by Warringah Council on 23 February 2016, was for an amalgamation of the Pittwater, Manly and Warringah councils.

On 12 May 2016, the council was amalgamated with Manly and Warringah Councils to form the Northern Beaches Council.

Council

Mayors/Deputy Mayors

Final composition and election method
Pittwater Council was composed of nine Councillors elected proportionally as three separate wards, each electing three Councillors. All Councillors were elected for a fixed four-year term of office. The Mayor and Deputy Mayor were elected annually by the Councillors at the first meeting of the Council. The last election was held on 8 September 2012, and the makeup of the Council was as follows when it was dissolved:

General Managers

Demographics
At the 2011 Census, there were  people in the Pittwater local government area, of these 48.8% were male and 51.2% were female. Aboriginal and Torres Strait Islander people made up 0.4% of the population. The median age of people in the Pittwater Council area was 42 years; notably above the national median of 37 years. Children aged 0 – 14 years made up 20.0% of the population and people aged 65 years and over made up 17.0% of the population. Of people in the area aged 15 years and over, 56.1% were married and 11.0% were either divorced or separated.

Population growth in the Pittwater Council area between the 2001 Census and the 2006 Census was 3.40% and in the subsequent five years to the 2011 Census, population growth was 5.54%. When compared with total population growth of Australia for the same periods, being 5.78% and 8.32% respectively, population growth in the Pittwater local government area was lower than the national average. The median weekly income for residents within the Pittwater Council area was higher than the national average.

At the 2011 Census, the proportion of residents in the Pittwater local government area who stated their ancestry as Australian or Anglo-Saxon exceeded 75% of all residents (national average was 65.2%). In excess of 57% of all residents in the Pittwater Council area nominated a religious affiliation with Christianity at the 2011 Census, which was slightly higher than the national average of 50.2%. Meanwhile, as at the Census date, compared to the national average, households in the Pittwater local government area had a significantly lower than average proportion (10.8%) where two or more languages are spoken (national average was 20.4%); and a significantly higher proportion (88.7%) where English only was spoken at home (national average was 76.8%).

Council seal
The seal of Pittwater Council was the result of a design competition held by the council that was won by retired Newport commercial artist Hugh Seelenmeyer. It was first used in the Manly Daily on 29 June 1991 and featured a mangrove tree surrounded by water, representing the close relationship of the area with water and bushland.

Sister cities
Pittwater Council's suburb Mona Vale is sister city to the United States village of Wilmette, Illinois and they participate in an annual student exchange program between their high schools. Pittwater and Wilmette are both home to a Bahá'í House of Worship.

References

External links
Pittwater Council (Archived)

Pittwater
1992 establishments in Australia
2016 disestablishments in Australia
Northern Beaches